The Virginia Building, also known as the Strollway Center and Montgomery Ward Building, is a historic commercial building located at the corner of 9th and Cherry Streets in Downtown Columbia, Columbia, Missouri.  It was originally built in 1911 to house one of the first urban Montgomery Ward department stores.  It is a two-story building with a flat roof and gold brick walls. Today the building houses several local businesses including, the Cherry Street Artisan and Columbia Photo.

In 2002, after an extensive restoration the building was placed on the National Register of Historic Places.

References

Montgomery Ward
Commercial buildings on the National Register of Historic Places in Missouri
Department stores on the National Register of Historic Places
Commercial buildings completed in 1911
1911 establishments in Missouri
Buildings and structures in Columbia, Missouri
National Register of Historic Places in Boone County, Missouri